"Supplies" is a song recorded by American singer-songwriter Justin Timberlake for his fifth studio album, Man of the Woods (2018). It was written and produced by Timberlake with Pharrell Williams and Chad Hugo of The Neptunes, and released on January 18, 2018. Its music video was directed by Dave Meyers. The song was serviced to rhythmic radio on January 23, 2018, as the album's second single.

Production
"Supplies" was the second single released from the album Man of the Woods, after the Timbaland- and Danja-produced "Filthy". "Supplies" was produced by Timberlake and The Neptunes. Despite The Neptunes' prolific production on *NSYNC's "Girlfriend", Timberlake's debut album Justified (which spawned a number of successful singles such as "Like I Love You", "Rock Your Body" and "Señorita"), and good relations with Timberlake, "Supplies" is the first solo song by Timberlake to be produced by the duo since 2003's "I'm Lovin' It", following The Neptunes' disputes with Jive Records (whom Timberlake was signed to at the time) over rap-group Clipse.

Composition
"Supplies" is an R&B song, with a steady beat and sitar-like melody with onomatopoeic interjections from Pharrell Williams.

Music video
Directed by Dave Meyers, the song's music video shows a couple living in a dystopian society with hints of the present. The clip starts in a darkened room with an array of television screens showing images of the socio-political climate. Co-star Eiza González interrupts a religious cult ritual, before entering a room full of levitating people with halos on their heads. Timberlake removes a halo from one of the people, causing them to collapse to the floor. Later, Timberlake is seen again in the room with the television screens, with said televisions combusting, before being joined by González in a post-apocalyptic scenario. A group of five children appear, with the duo taking them under their care. One of the children tells the viewer to "die already", and that they are "still asleep". Pharrell Williams, who did the co-production of the song, makes a brief cameo appearance in the video.

Credits and personnel 
Credits adapted from Discogs.

Justin Timberlake – production, vocal production
Pharrell Williams – production, additional vocals 
Chad Hugo – production
Andrew Coleman – engineering
Mike Larson – engineering
Jon Sher – assistant engineering
Ben Sedano – assistant engineering
Elliot Ives – guitar

Charts

Release history

References

2018 songs
2018 singles
Dystopian fiction
Justin Timberlake songs
Music videos directed by Dave Meyers (director)
Song recordings produced by Justin Timberlake
Song recordings produced by the Neptunes
Songs written by Chad Hugo
Songs written by Justin Timberlake
Songs written by Pharrell Williams